Bonesteel may refer to:

Bonesteel, South Dakota, United States
Charles H. Bonesteel III, American military commander
Charles Hartwell Bonesteel, Jr., American major general and the father of Charles H. Bonesteel III
Chesley Bonestell, American painter
Georgia Bonesteel, American quilter